Platycerozaena is a genus of beetles in the family Carabidae, containing the following species:

 Platycerozaena bordoni Ogueta, 1965
 Platycerozaena brevicornis Bates, 1874
 Platycerozaena magna (Bates, 1874)
 Platycerozaena panamensis (Banninger, 1949)

References

Paussinae